Greigia oaxacana is a plant species in the genus Greigia. This species is endemic to Mexico.

References

oaxacana
Endemic flora of Mexico